William Sydney Thayer (June 23, 1864 – December 10, 1932) was a physician and professor of medicine at the Johns Hopkins Hospital and Medical School. He was an acclaimed teacher of clinical practice and known as the clinician's clinician.

Thayer was born in Milton, Massachusetts where his father James Bradley was a professor of law at Harvard University. His mother Sophia Ripley was a cousin of Ralph Waldo Emerson. A younger sibling, Ezra, became dean of the Harvard Law School. William was educated at Harvard University, receiving a BA degree in 1885 after being briefly suspended for a prank. He received a medical degree in 1889. He then worked at the Massachusetts General Hospital and then went to Europe for further studies. He joined Johns Hopkins University School of Medicine in 1896 becoming a professor of clinical medicine in 1905. In 1917 he served with the American Expeditionary Forces in France. He also travelled through Russia via Canada and Japan as part of the Red Cross. He was an acclaimed teacher of medicine at Baltimore and also conducted research.

Thayer married Susan Chisolm Read, a student of nursing from Johns Hopkins, in 1901.

References

Other sources 
 Reid, Edith Gittings (1936) The Life and convictions of William Sydney Thayer, physician. Oxford University Press.

External links 

 The malarial fevers of Baltimore (1895)
 Lectures on the malarial fevers (1899)
Medical ethics] (1935)
 Laennec-one hundred years after the address in medicine (1919)
 Biography with portrait

1864 births
1932 deaths
People from Milton, Massachusetts
American physicians
Harvard College alumni
Johns Hopkins University faculty